is an extreme trans-Neptunian object and extended scattered disc object from the outermost region of the Solar System, approximately  in diameter.

Description 

It has also been observed as  during the Calar Alto TNO Survey at the Calar Alto Observatory, Spain, on 20 September 2015.

It orbits the Sun at a distance of 33.2–290.1 AU once every 2054 years and 9 months (semi-major axis of 161 AU). Its orbit has an eccentricity of 0.79 and an inclination of 23° with respect to the ecliptic.

Extended scattered disc 

It is one a small number of detached objects with perihelion distances of 30 AU or more, and semi-major axes of 150 AU or more. Such objects can not reach such orbits without some perturbing object, which lead to the speculation of planet nine.

Physical characteristics 

Based on an absolute magnitude of 6.5 and an assumed albedo of 0.09, the Johnston's Archive calculated a mean-diameter of 222 kilometers. Michael Brown estimates an albedo of 0.08 with a diameter of 221 kilometers using an absolute magnitude of 6.7. He also considers it a dwarf-planet candidate with a low probability ("possible").

See also 
 Planets beyond Neptune

References

External links 
 List Of Centaurs and Scattered-Disk Objects, Minor Planet Center
 List of known Trans-Neptunian Objects, Johnston's Archive
 Discovery Circumstances: Numbered Minor Planets (505001)-(510000) – Minor Planet Center
 
 

508338
508338
20101008